Kosalar or Kasalar or Kyosalar may refer to:
Kosalar, Agdam, Azerbaijan
Kosalar, Khojali, Azerbaijan
Kosalar, Lankaran, Azerbaijan
Kosalar, Qazakh, Azerbaijan
Kosalar, Lachin, Azerbaijan